Weekend Today is an Australian breakfast television program, hosted by Clint Stanaway and Jayne Azzopardi.

It has been broadcast live by the Nine Network since 2009 and airs after children's programming and runs from 7am to 10am on weekends. The show is broadcast from the Nine Network studios in North Sydney, a suburb located on the North Shore of Sydney, New South Wales.

History 
In January 2009, David Gyngell, chief executive of the Nine Network and John Westacott, former head of news and current affairs announced that Today would begin broadcasting on Sunday mornings. The program entitled, Today on Sunday, competes in the same timeslot as the Seven Network's Weekend Sunrise, which dominates Sunday morning television nationally, except on the east coast. The show launched on 1 February 2009 and the original team consisted of Cameron Williams and Leila McKinnon with the news presented by Amber Sherlock and the sport was presented by Tim Gilbert on Saturday and Michael Slater on Sunday.

On 2 May 2009, after the launch of Today on Sunday, the Nine Network announced through a surprise edition that Today on Saturday would return. The program incorporates the same presenting team as the Sunday edition, being the first Australian breakfast news program to broadcast seven days a week. Due to the launch of the Saturday version of the program, the Nine Network renamed the programs as Today: Weekend Edition. David Gyngell said the launch of the Weekend editions were a part of the Nine Network's plans to strengthen its news and current affairs department and return viewers to its once leading news service. In July 2009, Today: Weekend Edition was rebranded as Weekend Today.

In September 2012, Weekend Today was extended to 3 hours on Saturday mornings.

In September 2014, Deborah Knight permanently replaced Leila McKinnon as co-host of the show; following McKinnon's move to the News Department.

In February 2016, Cameron Williams announced his resignation from the Nine Network. Peter Stefanovic took over as co-host.

In November 2016, Peter Stefanovic announced that he would be moving to 60 Minutes in 2017 as a reporter. Tom Steinfort has been announced as Stefanovic's replacement.

In December 2017, Knight was appointed as host of Nine News Sydney on Friday and Saturday nights. She replaced Georgie Gardner who replaced Lisa Wilkinson on Today. It was later announced that 60 Minutes reporter Allison Langdon would replace Knight on Weekend Today. Peter Stefanovic also returned as host replacing Tom Steinfort who will become a reporter on 60 Minutes.

In December 2018, it was announced that Peter Stefanovic had parted ways with the Nine Network to pursue other opportunities. In January 2019, Today Extra host David Campbell was appointed as Stefanvoic's replacement. Clint Stanaway also joined the team as a sport presenter and Tim Davies as weather presenter.

In November 2019, the Nine Network announced that Karl Stefanovic would return to the show as co-host alongside Weekend Today co-host and 60 Minutes reporter Allison Langdon from January 2020.

In December 2019, it was announced that Today Extra host Richard Wilkins will replace Campbell, co-hosting alongside Rebecca Maddern. Jayne Azzopardi will continue to present news and Lauren Phillips will present weather.

In November 2021, it was announced that Rebecca Maddern had resigned from the Nine Network. Belinda Russell and Charles Croucher will replace Maddern and Jayne Azzopardi will continue to present news. Lauren Phillips also resigned from the show to concentrate on her radio career. In October 2022, Croucher was appointed as Nine News Political Editor.

In March 2023, Belinda Russell announced she had left Weekend Today. Her last appearance being 26 February.

As of March 2023, Clint Stanaway and Jayne Azzopardi are the hosts with TBA presenting news, Richard Wilkins presenting entertainment and Dan Anstey presenting weather.

Hosts

Anchors  
The hosts Weekend Today have included:

Fill-in presenters 
Current presenters who have been fill-in hosts or co-hosts of Weekend Today in recent times include Jayne Azzopardi, Tim Davies, Tom Steinfort, Mark Burrows, Lara Vella, Sophie Walsh, Clint Stanaway, Chris Kohler, Gavin Morris, James Bracey and Michael Genovese

Previous substitute presenters have included Amelia Adams, Brett McLeod, Wendy Kingston, David Campbell, Dougal Beatty, Tim Gilbert, Sylvia Jeffreys, Alicia Loxley, Davina Smith, Belinda Russell, Ben Fordham, Ken Sutcliffe, Natalia Cooper, Tony Jones, Brenton Ragless, Natalie Gruzlewski, Sarah Harris, Shelley Craft, Ross Greenwood, Chris Urquhart and Jonathan Uptin.

Reporters

News 
News presenters have included:

 Amber Sherlock (2009–2010)
 Alicia Gorey (2010–2011)
 Deborah Knight (December 2011 – May 2014)
 Sylvia Jeffreys (May 2014 – June 2014)
 Wendy Kingston (July 2014 – November 2015)
 Jayne Azzopardi (2016–2023)
 Lizzie Pearl (2023–present)

Lara Vella, Sophie Walsh, Davina Smith and Sarah Stewart are fill-in news presenters.

Sport 
Sport presenters have included:
 Michael Slater (Sunday: 2009–2010)
 Tim Gilbert (Saturday: 2009–2010)
 Tim Gilbert (2010 – September 2014)
 Nathan Brown (September 2014 – December 2014)
 Cameron Williams (2015–2016)
 Tom Steinfort (2016–2017)
 Peter Stefanovic (2016, 2018)
 Clint Stanaway (2019)
 Jayne Azzopardi (2020–2023)

Weather 
In December 2009, Felicity Whelan began presenting the weather on Weekend Today after she was chosen through the weekend weather competition, Whelan also filled in for Steven Jacobs on Today.
However, in April 2010, main fill-in weather presenter, Emma Freedman replaced Whelan who joined Network Ten. Due to budget cuts at the Nine Network, Freedman was made redundant in late 2014. In 2015, Natalia Cooper was appointed as weather presenter. In December 2016, Steve Jacobs announced that he would be leaving Today to join Weekend Today as weather presenter. In March 2019, it was announced that Nine News reporter Tim Davies would join the team as weather presenter. In December 2019, Lauren Phillips was announced as Weekend Today weather presenter replacing Tim Davies who was promoted to Today weather presenter. In November 2021, Lauren Phillips resigned from the show to concentrate on her radio career.

Weather presenters have included:
 Felicity Whelan (2009–2010)
 Emma Freedman (2010–2014)
 Natalia Cooper (2015–2016)
 Steve Jacobs (2017–2018)
 Tim Davies (2019)
 Lauren Phillips (2019–2021)
 Dan Anstey (2022–present)

Entertainment 
In February 2009, Michele Mahone joined Weekend Today as Hollywood Gossip reporter where she reported on the latest entertainment news. She remained with the show until September 2013 due to the show going in 'another direction'. That other direction was Susanne Messara who presented the latest entertainment news from the couch. This idea failed and media personality Giselle Ugarte was appointed entertainment presenter situated again in Hollywood. In 2015, Daily Telegraph columnist Elle Halliwell was appointed entertainment presenter replacing Ugarte. Halliwell along with the entertainment segments were removed shortly after.

Entertainment presenters have included:
 Michele Mahone (2009–2013)
 Susanne Messara (2013–2014)
 Gisele Ugarte (2014)
 Elle Halliwell (2015)

See also 
 List of Australian television series
 List of programs broadcast by Nine Network

References

External links 
 

2009 Australian television series debuts
2010s Australian television series
English-language television shows
Television shows set in Sydney